The Blood Brothers are a supervillain duo appearing in American comic books published by Marvel Comics.

Publication history
The Blood Brothers first appeared in Iron Man #55 (Feb. 1973) and were created by Jim Starlin.

Following their debut, the Blood Brothers returned in a Starlin/Friedrich story in Marvel Feature #12 (Nov. 1973), again fighting the superhero Iron Man, here teamed with Fantastic Four member The Thing. The Blood Brothers continued as Iron Man antagonists in Iron Man #88-89 (Aug.-Oct. 1976), then disappeared from publication for several years before resurfacing to battle the titular superhero team in The Avengers #252-253 (Feb.-March 1985). Following appearances in Quasar #12 (July 1990), and X-Men vol. 2, #107 (Dec. 2000), they temporarily switched alliances to aid Earth's superheroes against a common threat in the three-issue miniseries Maximum Security (Dec. 2000-Jan. 2001; first two issues released same month). They were next seen as interplanetary prison escapees on Earth in the four-issue miniseries Drax the Destroyer #1-4 (Nov. 2005-Feb. 2006), where one Blood Brother died.
    
They are unrelated to the high-tech motorcycle gang the "Blood Brothers", seen in X-51 #10-12 (May–July 2000).

Fictional character biography
The Blood Brothers are large twin ape-like aliens called Roclites originally in the service of the mad Titan Thanos, acting as the guardians of his first base on Earth. When Iron Man receives a mental signal sent by an imprisoned Drax the Destroyer, he becomes a target for the Blood Brothers, who ambush him and take him to Thanos' base where Drax is being held. When the two heroes overpower the brothers, Thanos detonates an explosion, forcing the heroes to flee, leaving the Blood Brothers behind. When Thanos later obtains the Cosmic Cube, Iron Man returns to Thanos' base to search for him, and is taken by surprise by the Blood Brothers, who are still alive, and remain loyal to Thanos. They attempt to kill Iron Man, but he and the Thing, who saw Iron Man's flight overhead and followed him to the base, overpower the Blood Brothers. With the henchmen defeated a second time, Thanos teleports the Blood Brothers to an unrevealed location.

They reappear years later in the service of the villain the Controller, and battle Iron Man once more. Iron Man defeats them both with the aid of the hero Daredevil. Sometime later, the United States military discovers Thanos' old Earth base in Arizona and, after activating some of the machinery, accidentally teleports in the Blood Brothers. The two battle the Avengers and are eventually depowered by Thanos' brother, Eros.

The Blood Brothers are imprisoned, but are later released by the hero Quasar and left on the planet Mars. They later attempt to stop Rogue of the X-Men from rescuing a mutant extraterrestrial of the Skrull race. The brothers later fight alongside Earth's metahumans against an invasion by Ego the Living Planet, but are later imprisoned with alien criminals Paibok the Power Skrull and Lunatik. The pair eventually escape and crash-land on Earth. They help enslave a small Alaskan town in an attempt to craft a space-worthy ship. This fails, due to the intervention of Drax the Destroyer, where one brother is apparently killed. The second brother, however survives, and is later seen escaping the Raft, a floating prison for supervillains.

The surviving Blood Brother later joins the Hood and his criminal empire, and helps fight the alien shape-shifting race the Skrulls during the Skrull invasion of Earth. He joins with the Hood's gang in an attack on the New Avengers, who were expecting the Dark Avengers instead. When Jonas Harrow, one of the many members of Hood's syndicate, develops a power drainer, the surviving Brother is part of the splinter group that forms and rebels against Norman Osborn's power structure. Most of this confrontation takes place in New York City's Times Square. This ends when Harrow is killed by the Hood.

Once again under command of Norman Osborn, the Blood Brother is part of the many villainous forces sent in as part of Siege of Asgard, a plan which ends with the sibling's severe wounding.

In the crossover series The Black Vortex, the Blood Brother is shown to be wasting away without his brother's life force to sustain him. Mister Knife exposes him to the titular artefact, which transforms him into a new, more powerful form (which Knife christens Brother Blood), and inducts him into his Slaughter Lords, alongside other beings who have been exposed to the Vortex's energies.

During the Avengers: Standoff! storyline, the Blood Brothers were inmates of Pleasant Hill, a gated community established by S.H.I.E.L.D. They attempt to kill S.H.I.E.L.D. agent Avril Kincaid at Pleasant Hill's Day Care Center only to be defeated by Sam Wilson, the current Captain America, and Winter Soldier.

The Blood Brothers later appear as members of the Grandmaster's Lethal Legion, where they compete against the Challenger's Black Order in a contest where Earth is the battlefield.

Powers and abilities
Each Blood Brother's tremendous strength and durability is dependent on his proximity to his twin. When standing together, the two have a high degree of superhuman strength, but if separated weaken to below even normal human levels. The Brothers also drain the blood of victims in the manner of a vampire, although it is unclear as to whether they totally rely on blood for sustenance.

In other media

Television
 The Blood Brothers appear in Avengers Assemble, voiced by David Kaye and by Liam O'Brien. In the episode "Hulked Out Heroes", they ambush the Hulk at the top of Avengers Tower until Captain America, Falcon, Hawkeye and Iron Man arrive. When the Blood Brothers have Hulk pinned down, they attach MODOK's device to Hulk's back that siphons Hulk's gamma energy, causing the Avengers to be infected with an unstable gamma energy virus. The Blood Brothers contact Iron Skull to tell them that their mission was a success. Red Skull cuts off the call from the Blood Brothers when they start to ask about payment.
 The Blood Brothers appear in Guardians of the Galaxy, both voiced by Kevin Michael Richardson. This version can join and split apart into one body and both of them can feel each other's pain. In the episode "Lyin' Eyes", the Blood Brothers were first encountered in their single body as a bouncer for a crooked auction house on Knowhere. When Drax the Destroyer and Rocket Raccoon try to get into the auction house under aliases, the Blood Brothers checked the list which told them to terminate on sight. Upon splitting apart, the Blood Brothers fought Drax the Destroyer and Rocket Raccoon where the two took advantage of the Blood Brothers' weakness to defeat them. Upon Drax the Destroyer and Rocket Raccoon being defeated by Mantis and Ebony Maw of the Black Order in the sinus cavity of Knowhere, the two had the Blood Brothers drop Drax the Destroyer and Rocket Raccoon on another planet. Once there, the Blood Brothers threw Drax the Destroyer and Rocket Raccoon into the quicksand. Before leaving the planet, the Blood Brothers told them not to struggle in the quicksand.

Video games 

 The Blood Brothers appear as a boss in Marvel's Guardians of the Galaxy, voiced by Kwasi Songul and Christian Jadah. In the game, they are depicted as bounty hunters and members of the Lethal Legion who are hired by Lady Hellbender to capture the Guardians of the Galaxy.

References

External links
 Blood Brothers at Marvel.com
 Blood Brothers at Marvel Wiki
 

Characters created by Jim Starlin
Comics characters introduced in 1973
Fictional characters with superhuman durability or invulnerability
Marvel Comics aliens
Marvel Comics characters with superhuman strength
Marvel Comics extraterrestrial supervillains
Marvel Comics supervillains